Chip Lindsey (born September 9, 1974) is an American college football coach and former player who is currently the offensive coordinator and quarterbacks coach at the University of North Carolina at Chapel Hill. He served as the head coach at Troy University from 2019–2021. Lindsey was previously the quarterbacks coach at Troy during the 2010 season. Lindsey has also previously served as the offensive coordinator at the University of Southern Mississippi (2014–2015), Arizona State University (2016) Auburn University (2017–2018), and UCF (2022).

Early life and education
Lindsey played three sports and graduated from Bob Jones High School in Madison, Alabama in 1992 and played football at University of North Alabama under then-head coach Bobby Wallace, before transferring to the University of Alabama located in Tuscaloosa, Alabama, and earned his bachelor's degree in history and English in 1997.

Coaching career

High school coaching
Lindsey began coaching as an assistant in 1997 at Springville High School located in Springville, Alabama. After two seasons he moved to Sparkman High School in Harvest, Alabama. In 2000, he moved to Deshler High School in Tuscumbia, Alabama and served as an assistant under AHSAA Hall of Fame coach John Mothershed,  until 2004 where he had two undefeated regular seasons. The following year in 2005, Lindsey became the head coach at Colbert Heights High School Tuscumbia, Alabama for two seasons with a combined record of 14–8. In 2007, he would become the offensive coordinator at Hoover High School under coach Rush Propst.  Following one season at Hoover, Lindsey became the head coach at Lassiter High School in Marietta, Georgia until 2009.

In 2011, after one season as Troy University quarterbacks coach, he would return to high school coaching at Spain Park High School in Hoover, Alabama where he would have a combined 15–9 record with two consecutive state playoff appearances, while Nick Mullens appeared as the 6A state player of the year.

Troy
Lindsey became quarterbacks coach under Larry Blakeney for the 2010 season where he coached Sun Belt Freshman of the Year Corey Robinson, who threw for 3,707 yards with 28 touchdowns and 15 interceptions while leading the No. 37 passing offense in the country.

Southern Miss
Under coach Todd Monken, Lindsey was named the offensive coordinator at The University of Southern Mississippi in 2014. In 2015, the Golden Eagles finished the season 9–5, 7–1 in C-USA play to be champions of the West Division. The 2015 team also finished 12th in the nation in total offense. They represented the West Division in the Conference USA Football Championship Game where they lost to Western Kentucky University. They were invited to the Heart of Dallas Bowl, where they were defeated by Washington.

Arizona State
In December 2015, it was announced that Lindsey would be named the new offensive coordinator at Arizona State University for the 2016 season. Arizona State would finish the 2016 season at 5-7, while averaging over 33 points per game and 11th in the nation in red zone offense.

Auburn 
Lindsey was an offensive analyst on Auburn's staff in 2013, the season the Tigers won the SEC title and fell 13 seconds short of a national championship. On January 21, 2017, Auburn head coach Gus Malzahn announced that Lindsey would serve as the new offensive coordinator, producing $800,000 in compensation. During the 2017 season, the Tigers won an SEC West Division Championship after wins over top-ranked Georgia and Alabama. For the 2018 season, Auburn finished 8–5. He left Auburn after 2018 to be the offensive coordinator at Kansas.

Troy

On January 11, 2019, Lindsey was named the new head football coach at Troy University. Troy fired Lindsey on November 21, 2021, with one game remaining in the 2021 season. Lindsey posted a record of 15–19 over three years with no bowl appearances.

UCF
After being let go by Troy, Lindsey reunited with Gus Malzahn at UCF. He was hired as UCF's offensive coordinator and quarterbacks coach. He spent one season in Orlando, and the Knights' offense finished 26th nationally in scoring, 11th in yards per game, and 8th in rushing.

North Carolina
Following Phil Longo's departure for Wisconsin, Lindsey was hired by Mack Brown as the Tar Heels' offensive coordinator and quarterbacks coach on December 15, 2022.

Head coaching record

College

References

External links
 
 Troy profile

1974 births
Living people
American football quarterbacks
Arizona State Sun Devils football coaches
Auburn Tigers football coaches
North Alabama Lions football players
Southern Miss Golden Eagles football coaches
Troy Trojans football coaches
High school football coaches in Alabama
High school football coaches in Georgia (U.S. state)
University of Alabama alumni
People from Madison, Alabama
Coaches of American football from Alabama
Players of American football from Alabama